Surupana (Aymara suru beak, pana a waterbird which lives at Lake Titicaca) is a  mountain in the Peruvian Andes. It is situated in the Puno Region, Azángaro Province, San José District. Surupana lies southeast of the mountain Hatun Qurini. By the local people the mountain is venerated as an apu.

References

Mountains of Puno Region
Mountains of Peru